Sphaerobacter is a genus of bacteria. When originally described it was placed in its own subclass (Spahaerobacteridae) within the class Actinomycetota. Subsequently, phylogenetic studies have now placed it in its own order Sphaerobacterales within the phylum Thermomicrobiota. Up to now there is only one species of this genus known (Sphaerobacter thermophilus). The closest related cultivated organism to S. Thermophilus is the Thermomicrobium Roseum and has an 87% sequence similarity which indicates that S. Thermophilus is one of the most isolated bacterial species.[4]

References 
4.  Pati, A., Labutti, K., Pukall, R., Nolan, M., Glavina Del Rio, T., Tice, H., … Lapidus, A. (2010). Complete genome sequence of Sphaerobacter thermophilus type strain (S 6022). Standards in genomic sciences, 2(1), 49–56. doi:10.4056/sigs.601105

Monotypic bacteria genera
Bacteria genera